Lieutenant General Giles Patrick Hill,  is a former senior British Army officer. He commanded the 1st (United Kingdom) Division from 2015 to 2017, was Assistant Chief of the Defence Staff (Defence Engagement) from 2017 to 2019, and served as the Deputy Commander of NATO's Resolute Support Mission in Afghanistan from 2019 until December 2020.

Early life and education
Hill was born in Leeds, Yorkshire, England. He was educated at Lawnswood School, a state secondary school in Leeds.

Military career
Hill served for 2 years as a Private soldier with the 4th Battalion, Parachute Regiment before he attended the Royal Military Academy Sandhurst (1989). He was commissioned into the Regular Army and the Parachute Regiment in 1990. He served several tours in Northern Ireland in the 1990s. He commanded A Company of 3rd Battalion, Parachute Regiment during Operation Telic in Iraq, for which he was awarded a Queen's Commendation for Valuable Service, and then became commanding officer of the 1st Battalion, Parachute Regiment on operations in both Iraq and Afghanistan.

Hill went on to be Commander of 16 Air Assault Brigade in May 2011, Deputy Commander of the 82nd Airborne Division at Fort Bragg in 2013, and General Officer Commanding 1st (United Kingdom) Division in April 2015. He became Assistant Chief of the Defence Staff (Defence Engagement) in April 2017. Hill was promoted to lieutenant general on 19 October 2019 and assumed the appointment of Deputy Commander Resolute Support Mission. He retired on 30 November 2021.

In January 2022, Hill was appointed as Honorary Colonel of 4th Battalion, Parachute Regiment.

Hill was appointed Commander of the Order of the British Empire (CBE) in the 2014 Birthday Honours, and Companion of the Order of the Bath (CB) in the 2021 New Year Honours.

References

1967 births
Military personnel from Leeds
Graduates of the Royal Military Academy Sandhurst
British Parachute Regiment soldiers
British Army lieutenant generals
British Army personnel of the Iraq War
British Army personnel of the War in Afghanistan (2001–2021)
British Parachute Regiment officers
Commanders of the Order of the British Empire
Companions of the Order of the Bath
Living people
People educated at Lawnswood School
Recipients of the Commendation for Valuable Service